Vranov nad Dyjí is a château in the homonymic town of Vranov nad Dyjí in the South Moravian Region, Czech Republic.

History
Vranov's location was first mentioned in Chronica Boemorum by Cosmas of Prague in 1100 as a border sentry castle. It was built by the Dukes of Bohemia to defend the southern border of Moravia against raids from the neighbouring Austrian March. Until 1323 the castle was in royal hands but in that year king John of Bohemia pawned Vranov to a powerful Bohemian nobleman, the viceroy Jindřich of Lipá.

In 1421, during the disturbances of the Hussite Wars the Bohemian noble family of Lichtenburg took control of the castle and the contiguous market town. In 1499 it definitely passed on to Lichtenburgs as hereditary possession by the king Vladislaus II of Bohemia and Hungary. The Lichtenburg family held Vranov for almost a century, until 1516.

In the 16th century, Vranov frequently changed the holders (chronologically: lords of Boskovice, Pernštejns, lords of Lomnice, Kraigers of Krajk and Dietrichsteins). Probably the most significant owners were lords from the Bavarian family of Althann, cousins of the Princes of Belmonte. Wolf Dietrich of Althann purchased the castle in 1614. Nevertheless, seven years later the manor was confiscated due to his participation in the rebellion of the Bohemian Estates. The confiscated castle was consequently sold to one of the Albrecht of Valdštejn's generals, Johann Ernst of Scherfenberg.

Michael Johann II Althann recovered the Vranov estate for the family in 1680. He commissioned the famous Austrian architect Johann Bernhard Fischer von Erlach to design a grand hall, known as ‘the Hall of the Ancestors’ in the Baroque style as a memorial to his Althann ancestors. It was built between 1687 and 1695. It's an oval construction surmounted by an imposing cupola and became a dominant feature of Vranov. An Austrian sculptor, Tobias Kracker, created large statues of the ancestors in niches around the walls and another Austrian artist, Johann Michael Rottmayr, painted an allegorical glorification of the Althann family in the cupola. To complement the Hall of the Ancestors with a spiritual element, Fischer von Erlach designed a Baroque chapel, the Chapel of the Holy Trinity, which incorporated an Althann family vault. The richly decorated chapel was built in two years (1699 and 1670). After the death of Michael Johann II Althann more grand buildings were constructed, completing the transformation of the original castle complex into an up-to-date Baroque chateau.

Gallery

References

External links

Baroque castle in the Czech Republic
Znojmo District
Castles in the South Moravian Region
Museums in the South Moravian Region
Historic house museums in the Czech Republic
National Cultural Monuments of the Czech Republic
Châteaux